The Jama Mosque is a mosque in Panama City, Panama.

History
The mosque was established in 1981 as the oldest mosque in the country.

Architecture
The mosque can accommodate up to 500 worshippers.

See also
 Islam in Panama

References

1981 establishments in Panama
Islam in Panama
Mosques completed in 1981
Mosques in Central America
Religious buildings and structures in Panama
Buildings and structures in Panama City